Dedinje (in Serbian; Дедиње) or Dedi (in Albanian) is a village in the municipality of Mitrovica in the District of Mitrovica, northern Kosovo. It is uninhabited according to the 2011 census.

Notes

References 

Villages in Mitrovica, Kosovo